Hamilton High School is a public high school in Hamilton, Ohio.  It is the only high school in the Hamilton City School District. It was the school in which then-President George W. Bush signed the No Child Left Behind Act on January 8, 2002.

History
The present building on Eaton Avenue opened as Taft High School in 1959. Taft served the west side of Hamilton while Garfield High School on Fair Avenue served the east. Both were consolidated to form Hamilton High School in 1980.

In 2002, an addition was built across the school's front, giving it new entrances, a new façade, a new library/media center, and six new classrooms. A new fine arts wing was finished in 2004. A recent bond issue approved the construction of a new gymnasium and to convert the old gym into a larger cafeteria. In 2012, the school began construction on the new gymnasium and lunch room. It concluded in 2013.

Hamilton had a high school at the corner of S. Second and Ludlow Streets downtown until 1915 when a new building was constructed at N. Sixth and Dayton Streets. The high school remained there until 1959, when Hamilton's population swelled and two high schools became necessary.

Athletics
The Hamilton Big Blue compete in the Greater Miami Conference. The Big Blue have captured over 80 conference championships since 1966.

OHSAA State Championships

Boys Basketball - 2004, 1962, 1954, 1949 
Boys Baseball - 1998, 1983
Girls Softball - 1985
Girls Bowling - 2022

Performing arts
Hamilton has three competitive show choirs: the mixed-gender Prestige, the all-female Vocal Elegance and the all-male CrescenDudes. The school also hosts its own competition, the Double H Showcase.

Notable alumni
 Aaron Cook, baseball player
 Mark Lewis, baseball player
 Joe Nuxhall, baseball player and announcer
 Floyd Reid, football player
 Paul Sarringhaus, football player
 Ricky Stone, baseball player
 Denicos Allen, football player
 Kevin Grevey, basketball player
 Ray Combs, comedian and game show host
 Adam Pankey, football player

Notes and references

External links
 District Website
 Unofficial Alumni Website (www.HHSAlumni.net)

High schools in Butler County, Ohio
Public high schools in Ohio
Buildings and structures in Hamilton, Ohio
Educational institutions established in 1981
School buildings completed in 1959
1981 establishments in Ohio